Frederick I. Sturm (March 21, 1951 – August 24, 2014) was a jazz composer, arranger and teacher.

Sturm studied at Lawrence University, the University of North Texas College of Music, and the Eastman School of Music. He played trombone and performed with the jazz nonet Matrix from 1974 to 1977. He served as Director of Jazz Studies at Lawrence University from 1977 to 1991, then joined the Eastman School of Music faculty as professor of jazz composition/arranging, conductor of the Eastman Jazz Ensemble and Studio Orchestra, and chair of the Eastman Jazz Studies and Contemporary Media Department. In 2002, he returned home to Wisconsin to direct the Lawrence University Jazz and Improvisational Music Department and hold the Kimberly-Clark Endowed Professorship in Music.

Conductor/clinician
Sturm has conducted the HR (Hessischer Rundfunk) Big Band in Frankfurt; the NDR (Norddeutscher Rundfunk) Big Band in Hamburg; the Bohuslän Big Band in Gothenburg, Sweden; the Klüvers Big Band in Aarhus, Denmark; the Arendal Big Band in Arendal, Norway; and collegiate and state honors high school jazz ensembles in the U.S. He has served as a visiting professor at Det Jyske Musikkonservatorium (Royal Conservatory) in Denmark and the Associazone Italian Gordon per l'Apprendimento Musicale in Rome. Down Beat magazine has cited his university jazz ensembles with 9 Student Music Awards. He was a co-owner of Tritone Jazz Fantasy Camps.

Composer/arranger
Sturm's Migrations contained indigenous music from 22 countries and was premiered by vocalist Bobby McFerrin and the NDR Big Band in 2007. He toured Europe the following summer. He arranged and recorded two albums: Libertango: Hommage an Astor Piazzolla and Do It Again: Three Decades of Steely Dan with the HR Big Band.

Abstract Image won the 2003 ASCAP/IAJE Commission in Honor of Quincy Jones. He is the Artistic Director, composer, and arranger for the Baseball Music Project, a concert program collaboration with the Baseball Hall of Fame that has been performed by the Boston Pops and symphony orchestras in Chicago, Seattle, Houston, Miami, Detroit, Indianapolis, Phoenix, and San Diego.

While studying at the University of North Texas College of Music in the 1970s, Sturm was a member of the One O'Clock Lab Band.

Publications
Sturm is the author of Changes Over Time: The Evolution of Jazz Arranging (Advance Music), Maria Schneider: Evanescence (Universal Edition), and Kenny Wheeler: Collected Works on ECM (Universal Edition). His compositions and arrangements have been published by Universal Edition, Kendor Music, Sierra Music Publications, Lorenz, Neil A. Kjos Music Company, and Alfred Music. He has received commission and research grants from ASCAP, International Association for Jazz Education, NARAS, NEA, NEH, the Lila Wallace-Reader's Digest Fund, and the American Composers Forum.

References

External links
 Fred Sturm's website
 Mizar 5 Interview with Fred Sturm
 Sturm "Migrations" project with Bobby McFerrin and NDR Big Band

1951 births
American jazz composers
American male jazz composers
2014 deaths
Lawrence University faculty
Lawrence University alumni
People from McHenry County, Illinois
University of North Texas College of Music alumni
Eastman School of Music alumni
Jazz musicians from Illinois